Los años felices (English title:The happy years) is a Mexican telenovela produced by Valentín Pimstein and directed by Enrique Lizalde and Jorge Sánchez-Fogarty for Televisa in 1984. Is the prequel of the 1985 telenovela Los años pasan.

Alma Muriel and Enrique Lizalde starred as protagonists, Lupita Ferrer, Laura Flores and Manuel Saval starred as co-protagonists, while Laura Zapata, Rebeca Rambal, Juan Ignacio Aranda and Martín Barraza starred as antagonists.

Cast 

Enrique Lizalde as Adrián
Alma Muriel as Eva
Lupita Ferrer as Marcela
Laura Zapata as Flora
Manuel Saval as Rodolfo
Roberto Ballesteros as Angelo
Rebeca Rambal as Silvia
Miguel Córcega as Elias
Laura Flores as María T.
Azucena Rodríguez as Blanca
Mariana Levy as Nancy
Juan Ignacio Aranda as Jorge
Demián Bichir as Tomas
Beatriz Moreno as Fresia
Germán Robles as Renato
Héctor Ortega as El Padrino
Ricardo Cortés as Hugo
Consuelo Frank as Ruperta
Luis Manuel Pelayo as Fernandez
Alicia Encinas as Celeste
Arturo Lorca as Maradona
Antonio Henaine as Cirilo
José Luis Duval as Avuña
Marta Zamora as Elisa
Aracely Guizar as Lucia
Rosario Monasterio as Alicia
Luis Gatica as Joel
Alfredo Garcia Marquez as Rosales
Javier Díaz Dueñas as Counter
Imperio Vargas as Clarisa 
Claudio Báez as Gabriel
Carlos Becerril as Napoleón
Ausencio Cruz as Carlos
Nuria Bages
Antonio Farré 	
Kenia Gazcon
Laura Heredia as Leonor
Imperio as Clarisa

Awards

References

External links

Mexican telenovelas
1984 telenovelas
Televisa telenovelas
1984 Mexican television series debuts
1985 Mexican television series endings
Mexican television series based on Chilean television series
Spanish-language telenovelas